(Madagascan Songs) is a set of three exotic art songs by Maurice Ravel written in 1925 and 1926 to words from the poetry collection of the same name by Évariste de Parny.

Structure
Scored for mezzo-soprano or baritone, flute, cello and piano, and dedicated to the American musician and philanthropist Elizabeth Sprague Coolidge, the set is usually performed complete as a true song cycle although this was not the composer's designation. The songs are:
"Nahandove" (incipit: "Nahandove, ô belle Nahandove")
"Aoua!" (incipit: "Aoua! méfiez-vous des blancs" [Ow! Beware of white people])
"Il est doux" (incipit: "Il est doux de se coucher durant la chaleur" [It is sweet to lie down during the heat])

Premiere and recordings 
Jane Bathori sang the premiere on 8 May 1926, in Rome, accompanied by flutist Louis Fleury, cellist Hans Kindler, and pianist Alfredo Casella. The first edition print was made by Luc-Albert Moreau. The first known record was that by Madeleine Grey, a highly regarded singer, in 1932. More recent recordings include:
Janet Baker (mezzo-soprano), Richard Adeney (flute), Terence Weil (cello), Lamar Crowson (piano) – L'Oiseau-Lyre SOL 298 – released 1967
Felicity Palmer (soprano), Judith Pearse (flute), Christopher van Kampen (cello), Clifford Benson (piano) – Argo ZRG 834 – recorded May 24–25 and July 9, 1975, in St John's, Smith Square
Frederica von Stade (mezzo-soprano), Doriot Anthony Dwyer (flute), Jules Eskind (cello), Martin Katz (piano) – CBS Masterworks 36665 – recorded November 10, 1979, in CBS 30th Street Studio
Nora Gubisch (mezzo-soprano),  (flute), Jérôme Pernoo (cello), Alain Altinoglu (piano) – Naïve Records V5304 – recorded June 2011 in the

See also 

In 2011, the British composer James Francis Brown wrote a work in three movements for the same instrumentation called Songs of Nature and Farewell, which is a setting of three little-known poems by the French composer Camille Saint-Saëns. In 2015 the British composer Judith Weir wrote a work in three movements for the same instrumentation called Nuits d'Afrique; it was commissioned by Wigmore Hall for the soprano Ailish Tynan. Both works are intended as a companion to Ravel's Chansons madécasses.

References

External links
 

Song cycles by Maurice Ravel
1926 compositions
1926 songs
Art songs
Music with dedications